Detective Inspector John Rebus is the protagonist in the Inspector Rebus series of detective novels by the Scottish writer Sir Ian Rankin, ten of which have so far been televised as Rebus. The novels are mostly set in and around Edinburgh. Rebus has been portrayed by John Hannah and Ken Stott for Television, with Ron Donachie playing the character for the BBC Radio dramatisations.

In the books

In a series of books and short stories by Ian Rankin, beginning with Knots and Crosses, published in 1987, and ending with Exit Music in 2007, John Rebus is a detective in the Lothian and Borders Police force, stationed in Edinburgh. After the first book, he is promoted from Detective Sergeant to Detective Inspector. In novels published Rebus’s retirement at the end of Exit Music, Rebus continues to work with the Edinburgh police,  either as a civilian or as a (brief) re-hire.

Backstory

Knots and Crosses was originally written as a standalone, non-genre novel, and it presents the fullest portrait of Rebus as a literary character. He comes from Fife, where his parents are buried, and where his only sibling Michael still lives. His father made a living as a stage hypnotist, and Michael is a success in the same profession. John is divorced from Rhona and has a daughter, Samantha, who is nearly twelve.

Rebus himself went from school into the army, and after a difficult stint in Northern Ireland at the beginning of The Troubles he signed up for the SAS.  There, he and another man were subjected to various kinds of torture in an attempt to see whether they would “break.” Rebus passed the test but, having had to abandon his companion, had a nervous breakdown himself. After recovering, he became a police detective. In Knots and Crosses, he suffers from PTSD (unnamed), which is cured when his brother hypnotizes him in Part 4 the novel.

In subsequent novels, we learn a little more about Rebus’s background. Because the author was gradually filling in details, there may be conflicts between details in one book and those in another. For example, in the first few novels, Rebus likes jazz, but in the fourth one (Strip Jack, 1992) he begins to admit a partiality for the Rolling Stones; from that point on, his favorite music is always folk and rock from his own and his author’s youths.  In Fleshmarket Close (2004), which is about immigrant trafficking, Rebus recalls that his paternal grandfather was a Polish immigrant. In Dead Souls (1999), he recalls his school-leaving party in Cardenden, Fife (Rankin's own home town), and his ill-fated plans to get a job and settle down with his boyhood sweetheart (Chapter 44).

Rebus lives in the apartment he bought with his wife Rhona in the 1970s, on Arden Street in the Marchmont neighborhood. During his relationship with Dr. Patience Aitken, he spends a lot of time at her flat, and even rents his apartment out to students in The Black Book (1993), though he has to move back in with them when Patience kicks him out. In The Falls (2001), he has the apartment rewired, with an eye to selling it, but changes his mind. In A Song for the Dark Times (2018), the garden flat in his own building has become vacant, and he moves to this smaller apartment, which will save him the difficult two-flight climb to his old flat.

Starting with Black and Blue (1997), Rebus drives an older Saab 900. Before that, he had admired a Saab and wished he could afford one (in Strip Jack). In some of the later novels, he talks to the Saab, thanking it for making long trips, and he is relieved in A Song for the Dark Times when it can be resuscitated from breakdown. In Even Dogs in the Wild (2015), he acquires a dog, Brillo.

Age

As Rankin developed Knots and Crosses into a series of crime stories, he allowed Rebus’s life to continue as if he were living in real time; thus in Knots and Crosses (1987) his daughter Samantha is “nearly twelve,” and in  Tooth and Nail (1992) she is about sixteen. By the year 2000, Rankin was aware that Rebus was reaching the age when he would be fully vested in his pension, and soon after that when he would reach 60, the age of mandatory retirement for police. Despite some indecision about Rebus’s actual age, Rankin settled on 1947 as the protagonist’s birth year and 2007 as his year of retirement. More recently, since Rebus retired, Rankin has admitted that the old man is no longer aging in real time—that he imagines Rebus as being in his late sixties in 2020, with some disabilities but still physically as well as mentally capable.

Although it is possible (as below) to summarize Rebus’s character and habits, he changes over the years. Early on, for example, he is ambitious, but as time goes by he sees that promotion would take him away from the hands-on investigative style he loves. To take another example, although his relationship with his daughter Samantha is a matter of rare phone calls for over a decade, they have more frequent visits after her daughter Carrie is born. To take a more precise example, in Dead Souls (1999) his reflexive bullying of pedophiles in earlier books  is gradually replaced by the realization that some of them, at least, have suffered abuse themselves.

Character and habits
John Lanchester, in an article written originally for the London Review of Books in 2000, says of Rebus:
Stubbornness is Rebus's most deep-seated characteristic. All the various ways in which he could improve the quality of his life - which boil down essentially to his being less impossible - are somehow unthinkable. He stands in everybody else's way, but he stands in his own way too: difficult, determined, remorseless, honourable, honest, and proud of his lack of charm. He is a deeply Scottish self-image….
Melanie McGrath, in a review of Even Dogs in the Wild, takes a slightly different view:
… an intensely romanticised, self-dramatising lone wolf, a kind of urban cowboy driven to detection as a means of resolving his existential crisis. As Rebus himself puts it, if justice didn’t matter, “then neither did he”.
In short, Rebus connects strongly with the type of the literary detective as defined in Raymond Chandler’s The Simple Art of Murder:

But down these mean streets a man must go who is not himself mean…. a man of honor—by instinct, by inevitability, without thought of it, and certainly without saying it….  I do not care much about his private life; he is neither a eunuch nor a satyr…. He will take no man’s money dishonestly and no man’s insolence without a due and dispassionate revenge. He is a lonely man…. He talks as the man of his age talks—that is, with rude wit, a lively sense of the grotesque, a disgust for sham, and a contempt for pettiness. The story is this man’s adventure in search of a hidden truth.

Rebus’s wit is very much as Chandler specifies. He loves to make jokes at the expense of others, especially his superiors and his friends. At times he even examines his own parting words, judging whether they were clever enough. He spars verbally with Siobhan Clarke but also with ‘Big Ger’ Cafferty.

His “honor” is somewhat peculiar. In particular, he will lie to a witness, swearing “this is just between the two of us,” with no intention of keeping pertinent information private or of protecting a confession. He treats the criminal Cafferty’s influence and knowledge as a resource in his investigations, and will sometimes do a favor for him. In Cafferty’s mind (and the minds of many others), Rebus belongs to him, but in Rebus’s own mind he is always fighting Cafferty, trying to collect evidence of his crimes.

Rebus is a heavy drinker and smoker, though always aware that this is bad for his health. He chooses to eat fried and/or fatty foods, knowing they are not good for him. His knowledge of Edinburgh bars and his appreciation of malt whiskies are encyclopedic. Starting with Mortal Causes (1994), his favorite hangout and meeting-place is the Oxford Bar, and from Exit Music to Rather Be the Devil the ritual of going outside the bar to smoke is part of his routine. In Black and Blue (1997), with the help of his old friend Jack Morton, he stops drinking, and he is able to continue abstaining through the next book, The Hanging Garden, but at the end of that novel Jack dies and Rebus resumes drinking. From one novel to another, he may try to ration cigarettes, but he is not able to quit smoking entirely until he begins to suffer from COPD at the beginning of Rather Be the Devil (2016); at that time he also begins to cut back on his drinking.

Music is important to Rebus, though he does not play an instrument himself. He has an extensive collection of vinyl, augmented when his brother Michael dies and leaves him records from their youth (The Naming of the Dead). It is not until Mortal Causes (1994), however, that his love of rock and folk from the 1960s and 70s is firmly established. In Black and Blue. The Hanging Garden, and Dead Souls (1997–99), Rebus’s stream of consciousness is sometimes presented as a series of song and album names, which both identify and dismiss his emotional reactions to a situation; starting with Set in Darkness (2000), he plays a game with Siobhan Clarke of reciting song names and expecting her to identify them. Clarke gives him newer music to listen to, and forms opinions about his favorites, too. In A Song for the Dark Times, Chapter 4, she tells their friend Fox,
”John says he wants it put on his gravestone: ‘He listened to the B-sides.’” 
Books are important to him, but his interest tends to be aspirational; he struggles with the sense that he might (or might not) have done better if he had had better educational opportunities. Especially in the earlier novels, there are references to piles of unread books in his apartment, and to the fact that his wife Rhona, an English teacher, took many of the books originally in the apartment when she left him. Aside from Crime and Punishment, he doesn’t actually read much.

Rebus's interest in politics is informed by a deep skepticism. Rankin considers him to be "small-c conservative" and therefore unlikely to support political change; at one point in Strip Jack (1992), he tells his friends Brian and Nell that he has only voted three times in his life, "Once Labour, once SNP, and once Tory." On the other hand, when Scottish First Minister Nicola Sturgeon suggested in a public venue that Rebus would have voted pro-Brexit, Rankin was taken aback.

Rebus’s romantic life is varied. He has occasional one-night stands (Knots and Crosses, Black and Blue, Set in Darkness). His more durable relationships are with women who have a superior education to him, including his wife Rhona, DI Gill Templar, Dr. Patience Aitken, the museum curator Jean Burchill, and Professor Deborah Quant. His experiments in living with a woman (Rhona, Patience) are not successful. He can never put a woman’s needs before those of his current case; he is usually the one who gets left or dismissed. In A Song for the Dark Times (2020) he and Deborah Quant are satisfied with being “friends with benefits.”

His most enduring relationship is with Siobhan Clarke, but its romantic expression peaks with a single kiss at the end of A Question of Blood. From the Set in Darkness (2000) cases on, Clarke ceases to be a helper or sidekick and becomes a colleague for Rebus, and any erotic element needs to be suppressed or repurposed to maintain that relationship, which is important to both of them. In Set in Darkness, Rebus defends her from a stalker, and in the 2002-2004 sequence,  Resurrection Men, A Question of Blood, and Fleshmarket Close, he is explicitly compared to a knight (i.e., the man for whom a quest is inspired by, but also more important than, a woman). She is sometimes mistaken for his daughter, and in A Song for the Dark Times (2000) she performs the daughterly task of helping him move house.

Career

Rebus’s early career must be retrospectively constructed from information in later ones. 
 Some time before 1976, he joined the police and, after some training, started out as a Detective Constable. His mentor then was DI Laurence Geddes (Black and Blue), who retired around 1976 after the Spaven Case.
 DC Rebus moved in 1984 to the fictional Summerhall station, where DI Stefan Gilmour was his mentor until Gilmour resigned due to a scandal (Saints of the Shadow Bible).
 DS Rebus is based in 1987 at the fictional Great London Road station, where he stays until 1993
 DI Rebus In 1991 is under Chief Superintendent Watson, who remains his superior officer until 1999 or so. 
 DI Rebus is sent in 1992 to assist the Metropolitan Police in London on a serial killer case.
 By 1993, the CID team from Great London Road is moved to the real-life station at St Leonard’s (The Black Book). This remains DI Rebus’s station until about 2004.
 In 1994, DI Rebus is assigned temporarily to the Crime Squad at the Fettes Avenue Police Headquarters (Mortal Causes).
 In 1996, DI Rebus is offered a promotion to DCI, but in a rural area; he asks that it be given to DI Flower, his rival and enemy, to get him out of Edinburgh (Let it Bleed).
 In 1997, DI Rebus is assigned temporarily to the rough neighborhood station at Craigmillar. His involvement in the 1976 Spaven case is under investigation. 
 In 1998, DI Rebus is assigned to a committee to give advice on security for the new Scottish Parliament (Set in Darkness, 2000).
 In 2002, DI Rebus is sent on a course for difficult senior officers to keep them on track for their pensions, at Tulliallan Police College (Resurrection Men).
 From 2004-2007, DI Rebus and DS Clarke are assigned to the real-life Gayfield Square station. He is considered retirement age and is not welcome. 
 In November 2007, DI Rebus retires, as is mandatory at the age of 60.
 In Standing in Another Man’s Grave (2012)   John Rebus is working for SCRU, a unit that examines unsolved cold cases.
 In Saints of the Shadow Bible (2013), due to a change in the retirement regulations, Rebus has become a DS again, assigned to Gayfield Square, where Clarke is now a DI. He is the subject of suspicion for his stint at Summerhall in the 1980s. 
 In novels after 2013, Rebus is definitively retired and his relationship with the police is at best that of a “Consulting Detective” (a la Sherlock Holmes)—at worst, an obnoxious pest.

As a policeman, Rebus develops into a maverick who keeps his investigations to himself as long as possible, but is relentless in using every means to solve a murder. He strives to build up as complete a picture as possible of the victims and suspects. Sometimes he or others understand his obsessiveness as paranoia or conspiracy thinking, sometimes as solving a jigsaw puzzle. Early on, he is ambitious, but the role of Detective Inspector, in charge of a team but with considerable discretion to control an investigation, is not one he can trade for a more desk-bound and politically sensitive role.

He is also an exemplar to others of the (bad) old-fashioned style of policeman. He is suspended from duties or asked to “take a vacation” in at least 8 of the novels, usually for extreme insubordination or because he is literally trying to investigate his own past sins.  In Black and Blue (1997), Rebus is haunted by a case from 1976, in which his first police mentor framed a man for murder, and Rebus lied on the witness stand to support him. In Saints of the Shadow Bible (2013), Rebus recalls his time in Summerhall police station in the 1980s, among violent and corrupt cops who still, in 2013, have much to hide.

Rebus wants, in the present of each novel, to improvise a team that will agree on nature of justice and both allow and critique the methods he uses to pursue it. Brian Holmes, Siobhan Clarke, and Ellen Wylie are some of the young cops he recruits over the years. His main ally and sounding-board is Siobhan Clarke, introduced in 1993’s The Black Book and given a larger role starting in 2000’s Set in Darkness. She represents a new generation of policing, able to incorporate some of Rebus’s passion into a cooler, more even-handed style. Malcolm Fox, the protagonist of two of Rankin’s novels and, in the later ones, a colleague of Clarke and Rebus, is yet another style of policeman, intensely self-controlled and aware of the law. After a successful career monitoring police ethics in the “Complaints” unit, he comes to sympathize with Rebus’s need to defy orders in his investigations.

Historical observer

Rebus’s long career tracks a number of developments from 1987 to the present:
 Changes in police structure, policy, and procedures in Scotland, as oversight and, eventually, centralization affect the situation of cops and teams of cops on the ground. 
 Changes in Edinburgh, including gentrification, the influx of immigrants, the construction of the Scottish parliament and its effects on real estate, the institution of one-way streets, and the lengthy attempt to construct a tramline.
 Scottish politics, including the establishment of a Scottish Parliament, and the 2014 referendum on Scottish independence. Flashbacks and cold cases bring into view the 1979 referendum and the more violent period of partisanship that preceded it.
 The increasing reliance of the police (and also of everyday people) on data and electronic devices. Early on, computer screens and the HOLMES police database mystify Rebus (Black and Blue, Chapter 5). When an email exchange is central to a case, in The Falls (2001), he lets his younger colleagues pursue that aspect of it. In A Question of Blood (2003), he declares himself a “dinosaur” with respect to technology, and he literally smashes his cellphone when his call is not answered, but in the same book he gets hold of a laptop in order to view the webcam feed of a young, female cousin. Eventually he is relying on a mobile phone, texts, and search engines.

Influences

In his introduction to Rebus: The Early Years (2000), Ian Rankin explains that part of the original inspiration for Rebus had to do with wanting to retell Robert Louis Stevenson’s classic horror story Strange Case of Dr Jekyll and Mr Hyde, with Rebus as Jekyll threatened by his evil alter ego from the past. The Jekyll and Hyde theme is explicit in the first three novels, but reappears throughout the series, often expressed by Rebus to himself as the relationship between Edinburgh’s “overworld and underworld.” As John Lancaster noted in 2000, 
The aspect of the Jekyll and Hyde story which particularly interested Rankin was its portrayal of Edinburgh as a city of appearances and division, a place of almost structural hypocrisy.

Rebus can be said to belong to a long tradition of paternal Scottish hard men. A natural leader whose gruff exterior and fierce will to succeed in his field belies a benevolent nature. The character owes as much to the likes of Scottish football players Jock Stein and Bill Shankly as it does to a more obvious relation, the TV detective Jim Taggart.
In an Independent on Sunday interview Rankin said that he drew "some of his inspiration" for the character from the "sixth Stone", Ian Stewart.
 Three of the Inspector Rebus books are named after Stones albums: Black and Blue, Let It Bleed and Beggars Banquet.

List of stories
For a list of the novels and stories in which John Rebus appears, see Inspector Rebus Series: Publishing history

Other media

TV
Plans were afoot in the late 1980s and early '90s to bring Rebus to television in an adaptation of Knots and Crosses with Leslie Grantham in the lead but this came to nothing. Ian Rankin believes that it was likely they would have made Rebus English or relocated the entire story to London.

Rankin has revealed the BBC were also keen to cast Robbie Coltrane as Rebus in a mooted adaptation of the series in the 1990s. Rankin smiled a bit, imagining flashbacks to Rebus's SAS training with Private Robbie Coltrane running over the assault course!

In the Rebus television adaptations he was played by John Hannah in the first series, a casting decision in which Hannah felt he was forced. It was his production company behind the series and his original suggestion was Peter Mullan. However, he claimed the corporation would not commission a relatively unknown actor. In the later series, following Hannah and his production team's exit, the role was taken over by Ken Stott.

A lot of Rebus's character foibles are glossed over in the adaptations, for example his large LP collection and the frequent popular music references and thoughts that Ian Rankin weaves into the stories.  However, Rebus' reliance on alcohol is evident and he is often seen drinking in the Oxford Bar. Also, in the television series Rebus is portrayed as being a supporter of Hibernian (like Siobhan Clarke). This is not found in Ian Rankin's books, he having stated outside the books that Rebus is a Raith Rovers supporter. Rebus's Fife accent is softened as well; in the novel Tooth and Nail, London Metropolitan Police colleagues find it difficult to understand his speech.

In November 2022, it was announced that Nordic streaming service Viaplay will produce a new Rebus adaptation, as the company's debut UK production. In March 2023, Richard Rankin was announced to be starring as Rebus.

BBC Radio
Alexander Morton played Rebus in a 1999 BBC Radio 4 adaptation of Let It Bleed.

Ron Donachie starred as Rebus in BBC Radio 4's dramatizations of The Falls (2008), Resurrection Men (2008), Strip Jack (2010), The Black Book (2012), Black and Blue (2013) and "Rebus Set in Darkness" (2014).

BBC Radio has also broadcast abridged readings of Ian Rankin's "Rebus" novels, including Let It Bleed read by Alexander Morton, of the novella Death Is Not the End read by Douglas Henshall and of the short story "Facing the Music", from Beggars Banquet, read by James MacPherson.

Stage
Rankin, with Rona Munro wrote the stage play Rebus: Long Shadows, which premiered at the Birmingham Repertory Theatre in September 2018. Northern Irish actor Charles Lawson played Rebus. Ron Donachie, who had frequently played the character for BBC Radio, took over the role for the 2019 run, after Lawson suffered a minor stroke.

Rankin has since written a second play with Simon Reade. Entitled Rebus: A Game Called Malice, the production will debut at the Queen's Theatre, Hornchurch on 2 February 2023. John Michie will play Rebus.

Short film
In May 2020, Brian Cox played an older Rebus in the short film John Rebus: The Lockdown Blues for BBC Scotland's Scenes for Survival, which is set in a locked down Edinburgh during the COVID-19 pandemic. The film was written by Ian Rankin for the National Theatre of Scotland.

See also
Areas of Edinburgh

References

External links
Ian Rankin
Rebus TV Series IMDB
Rebus and Rankin at Scotsman.com
Rampant Scotland Article
Unofficial Oxford bar Forum

Fictional British police detectives
Fictional people from Edinburgh
Ian Rankin characters